Donald C. "Tripp" Keister (born September 27, 1970) is an American professional baseball coach and manager of the Harrisburg Senators, a Class-AA minor league affiliate of the Washington Nationals.

Career

As a player
As an outfielder at the University of Delaware, Keister was a 33rd-round draft pick of the New York Mets in the 1992 Major League Baseball draft. He turned pro and played four seasons in the Mets minor league system, topping out with the Class-AA Binghamton Mets.

Keister amassed a career batting average of .269, but he only managed two home runs across four minor league seasons before he retired from playing.

As a coach
After leaving professional baseball, Keister latched on with the University of South Carolina as an assistant coach from 1996 to 1998. He was hired as head coach at Delaware State University, a role he filled from 1999 to 2000. For several years, he returned to professional baseball as a scout for the San Diego Padres, before he resumed a collegiate coaching role as head coach at Wesley College, then a private liberal arts college in Dover, Delaware, in 2006.

The Washington Nationals hired Keister after five years coaching at Wesley College. He was named manager of the Gulf Coast League Nationals in 2012 and the Class-A Hagerstown Suns in 2013, before he was promoted to Class-A Advanced as manager of the Potomac Nationals. In December 2020, with the minor league Nationals—since relocated to Fredericksburg, Virginia, as the Fredericksburg Nationals—being relegated to Class-A play, the Nationals promoted Keister again to serve as coach of their Class-AA affiliate, the Harrisburg Senators.

Personal life
Keister grew up in Hockessin, Delaware, one of five children in his family. Judy Johnson, a Hall of Famer who played for 17 seasons in the Negro leagues, was his father's next-door neighbor. Keister's younger brother Tyler died in 2012 at age 24.

During the baseball off-season, Keister lives in Delaware.

References

1970 births
Living people
Minor league baseball managers
Baseball players from Delaware
People from Hockessin, Delaware
Delaware State Hornets baseball coaches